Mesaiokeras is a genus of crustaceans belonging to the monotypic family Mesaiokeratidae.

The species of this genus are found in Southern Europe.

Species:

Mesaiokeras heptneri 
Mesaiokeras hurei 
Mesaiokeras kaufmanni 
Mesaiokeras marocanus 
Mesaiokeras mikhailini 
Mesaiokeras nanseni 
Mesaiokeras semiplenus 
Mesaiokeras spitsbergensis 
Mesaiokeras tantillus

References

Crustaceans